The madrasa of Sidi Ali Chiha (Arabic: مدرسة سيدي علي شيحة) is one of the madrasas of the medina of Tunis attached to a zaouïa and built during the reign of Sadok Bey.

Etymology 
It takes its name from the saint Sidi Ali Chiha, sheikh of the Aïssawa brotherhood, died in 1854.

Location 
It is located on rue du Salut, in the El Halfaouine district, at the northern suburb of the medina of Tunis. It is only a few meters away from the Saheb Ettabaa Madrasah.

History 

It was built in 1852 by the Husainid minister Mustapha Khaznadar, who had huge respect for the spiritual leader of the Aïssawas brotherhood.

Evolution 
This monument, completely restored in 1995, housed for years the National Calligraphy Center1.

References 

Sidi Ali Chiha
Educational institutions established in 1852
1852 establishments in Africa
19th-century establishments in Tunisia